Radim Sáblík (born 5 September 1974) is a retired Czech football player who played as a defender.

Club career
In his career he has played for clubs in Czech Republic and Poland including FC Baník Ostrava, FK VP Frýdek-Místek, FC Karviná, Odra Wodzisław Śląski and Dyskobolia Grodzisk Wielkopolski.

Honours
Dyskobolia Grodzisk Wielkopolski
Polish Cup (2004–05)

References

External links
 

1974 births
Living people
Czech footballers
Czech First League players
FK Frýdek-Místek players
FC Baník Ostrava players
MFK Karviná players
Odra Wodzisław Śląski players
Dyskobolia Grodzisk Wielkopolski players
Obra Kościan players
Czech expatriate footballers
Expatriate footballers in Poland
Czech expatriate sportspeople in Poland
Association football midfielders